The 9K33 Osa (literally "wasp"; NATO reporting name SA-8 Gecko) is a highly mobile, low-altitude, short-range tactical surface-to-air missile system developed in the Soviet Union in the 1960s and fielded in 1972. Its export version name is Romb.

Description

The Osa was the first mobile air defense missile system incorporating its own engagement radars on a single vehicle.

All versions of the 9K33 feature all-in-one 9A33 transporter-launcher and radar vehicles which can detect, track and engage aircraft independently or with the aid of regimental surveillance radars. The six-wheeled transport vehicles BAZ-5937 are fully amphibious and air transportable. The road range is about 500 km.

The 1S51M3-2 radar system on the 9K33 Osa TELAR received the NATO codename Land Roll. It was derived from the naval 'Pop Group' radar system but is smaller since it does not require the elaborate stabilisation system. An improved system, the Osa-AKM (NATO reporting name SA-8B 'Gecko' Mod 1) was first seen in Germany in 1980. It had improvements added to the launcher configuration, carrying six missiles in ribbed containers. 

The system is reported to be of the frequency-agile monopulse type. It consists of an elliptical rotating surveillance antenna mounted on top of the array, operates in H band (6 to 8 GHz) and has a 30 km acquisition range against most targets. The large pulsed J band (14.5 GHz) engagement antenna is mounted below it in the centre of the array and has a maximum tracking range of about 20 km.

Mounted on either side of the tracking radar antenna is a small J band parabolic dish antenna to track the missile. Below that is a small circular antenna which emits an I band uplink capture beam to gather the missile shortly after launch. The final antennas in the array are two small white rectangular ones, one on either side of the array mounted alongside the I band. These are used for command uplink to the missile. This twin antenna system permits the 'Land Roll' radar to control up to two missiles simultaneously against a single target. 

The two missiles can be guided on different frequencies to further complicate electronic countermeasures (ECM). There is a tubular device fitted to and above the tracking radar; this is a 9Sh33 electro-optical tracker. It can be used to track the target when the main tracking radar is jammed by ECM.

A 9K33 battery comprises four 9A33B TELAR vehicles and two 9T217 transloader vehicles on BAZ-5939 chassis with reload missiles and a crane. A reload time of five minutes has been reported per TELAR.

In addition to the TELARs, each regiment is also assigned a single radar collimation vehicle 9V914 (initially on the BAZ-5938 chassis but more often found on the ZiL-131 truck). This vehicle assists in the alignment of the TELAR's radar systems, ensuring accurate target tracking and engagement.

Variants

 4K33 "OSA-M" (NATO reporting name SA-N-4 "Gecko") was introduced in 1972 and is the naval version of the system with two 9M33M missiles on a Zif-122 retractable rotating launcher and improved performance.
 9K33M2 "Osa-AK" (US DoD designation SA-8B "Gecko Mod-0") with TELAR 9A33BM2 was introduced in 1975 with the new six-missile box launcher, each 9M33M2 missile being a sealed round.
Most OSA-AKM systems also feature an IFF antenna.
 Saman and Saman-M (Russian Саман – adobe) is a development of the Osa\Osa-M system into target drones, used for testing and training with air defense systems, including SAMs.
The 9K33M3 is also able to use missiles which are wire-guided, presumably for use in an ECM-heavy environment where the radio command guidance may not operate properly.

Missiles

Engagement range for the early versions is approximately 2–9 km (1.3–5.6 miles) and engagement altitudes of between 50 and 5,000 m (164–16,400 ft). The 9M33M2 "Osa-A" missile extends the ranges out to 1.5–10 km (1–6.2 miles) and engagement altitudes to 25–5,000 m (82–16,400 ft). The 9M33M3 missile greatly enhances the altitude engagement envelope to 10–12,000 m (33–42,500 ft), and as such are also able to fly further (about 15 km/9 miles) but the system is not able to engage targets at longer ranges, due to other factors such as the radar tracking of the missiles. The system is designed for use primarily against jet aircraft and helicopters in any kind of weather.

The 9M33 missiles are 3.158 m (10.3 ft) long, weigh 126 kg (278 lb) and use command guidance. There is also a backup low-light optical tracking system for heavy ECM environments. The latest 9M33M3 missiles have an increased total weight of 170 kg (375 lb) in order to provide the extended range coverage and larger warhead. Propulsion is provided by a dual-thrust solid fuel rocket motor. Both versions feature a missile speed of around Mach 2.4 (peaking at around Mach 3) for a maximum target engagement speed of around Mach 1.4 for the original missile and Mach 1.6 for the M2\M3 missiles. The warhead for the initial and M2 versions weighs 19 kg (42 pounds), increased to 40 kg (88 lb) in the M3 version to improve performance against helicopters. All versions have impact and proximity fuzes.

There have been unconfirmed reports of other possible versions of the missile with both infrared and semi-active radar terminal homing seekers.

Each TELAR is able to launch and guide two missiles against one target simultaneously. Kill probability is quoted as being 0.35–0.85 for the Osa and 0.55–0.85 for the Osa-AK and Osa-AKM (presumably depending upon target aspect, speed, maneuverability and radar cross section). Reaction time (from target detection to launch) is around 26 seconds. Time to prepare for engagements from being in transit is around 4 minutes and missile reloading takes around 5 minutes. Each battery of four TELARs is usually accompanied by two reload vehicles carrying 18 missiles in sets of three, with a crane mounted on the reload vehicles to assist in moving the missiles.

When launched the booster motor burns for two seconds, this permits the radar to gather and control it at very short ranges (about 1.6 km). The sustainer motor has a 15-second burn, bringing the missile to a top speed of about Mach 2. Once launched the missile is command-guided for the whole flight, and the warhead is detonated by its proximity fuze or possible command. The warhead is said to have a lethal radius of 5 m at low altitude against an F-4 Phantom size target.

Radars

 1S51M3 ("Land Roll") – C band target acquisition radar, H band conical scan target tracking radar and two J band pulse mode fire control radars (range 35 km/22 miles for acquisition, 30 km/19 miles for tracking and 25 km/16 miles for guidance). Mounted on the TELAR.
 P-40 ("Long Track") – E band early warning radar (also used by the 2K11 Krug and 2K12 Kub, range 175 km/108 miles), mounted on a tracked vehicle (a modified AT-T).
 P-15 ("Flat Face A") or P-19 ("Flat Face B") or P-15M(2) ("Squat Eye") – 380 kW C band target acquisition radar (also used by the S-125 Neva and 2K12 Kub, range 250 km/155 miles), mounted on a ZiL-131 truck.
 PRV-9 or PRV-16 ("Thin Skin") – E band height finding radar (also used by the 2K11 Krug and 2K12 Kub, range 240 km/148 miles), mounted on a KrAZ-255B truck.

Deployment and history
Produced by the USSR/Russia, there are many export customers for this system, including Cuba, Greece (from the former East Germany), Poland, Syria, Ecuador and Iraq.

After the Israeli invasion of Lebanon in 1982, in which Syrian air defenses were obliterated by a massive air campaign against Syrian SAM sites in the Beqaa valley, the Syrians managed to deploy Osas. At least one F-4 Phantom in a SEAD mission was shot down on July 24, 1982 by an Osa system. The WSO (back seater), Aharon Katz was killed, while the pilot, Gil Fogel, survived and was held captive by the Syrians for two years.

In late 1980s, Cuba deployed several 9K33 Osa units in southern Angola which posed a significant threat to South African air superiority at shorter ranges. The South African 61 Mechanised Battalion Group captured an intact 9K33 Osa anti-aircraft missile system on 3 October 1987 during the Battle of Cuito Cuanavale. This was the first time that such a system had ever fallen into the hands of non-Warsaw Pact forces, giving Western intelligence agencies an opportunity to examine an important Soviet-bloc weapon system.

Iraq used Osa systems during the 1991 Gulf War.

The system also saw use in the 2008 Russo-Georgian War by both the Georgian and Russian militaries.

Libyan 9K33 Osa were used, and some destroyed during the 2011 Libyan Civil War by NATO airstrikes.

Yemeni Civil War 
On 29 November 2019, Russian sources speculated that a Soviet made 9K33 Osa fired by Houthi forces shot down a Saudi Arabian Army Aviation AH-64 Apache. Neither Yemen nor Iran had any 9K33 Osa in their armed forces, while known Houthis' operated systems are based on the Soviet made surface-to-air 2K12 Kub which employs a two-stage rocket engine and the air-to-air missiles R-73 and R-27T which both have a single stage rocket engine.

2020 Nagorno-Karabakh conflict
The Armenian Air Defense extensively employed 9K33 Osa missile systems during the 2020 Nagorno-Karabakh conflict. During the opening days of the war, several videos released by the Azerbaijani military showed several Armenian 9K33 Osa and 9K35 Strela-10 vehicles destroyed by Bayraktar TB2 armed drones, with a number of them destroyed in the following weeks when found on the battlefield. Twelve 9K33 Osa missile systems of Armenian Army were destroyed during the Nagorno-Karabakh conflict by Azerbaijani Bayraktar TB2s.
On 4 October 2020, an Azerbaijani Air force Sukhoi Su-25 aircraft was shot down, by Armenian forces, probably by a 9K33 Osa while targeting Armenian positions in Fuzuli. The pilot, Col. Zaur Nudiraliyev, died in the crash. Azerbaijani officials acknowledged the loss in December 2020, with the 9K33 Osa vehicle possibly using passive detection and shoot and scoot tactics to survive the Azerbaijani suppression of air defenses missions.

Russo-Ukrainian War

Both Russia and Ukraine have 9K33 Osa systems in their inventory.

On 30 March 2019, during the War in Donbas, the Ukrainian Joint Forces reported destruction of an Osa-AKM surface-to-air missile system along with a Zhitel R-330Zh automatic jamming system.

On 23 March 2022, following the Russian invasion, The Washington Post reported that the United States was sending additional systems to Ukraine.

Command post
PPRU-M1 (PPRU-M1-2) is a mobile command center for a mixed grouping of air defense forces, such as 9K33 Osa and the Tor missile system, 9K22 Tunguska, 9K35 Strela-10 and 9K38 Igla.

Upgrades

Belarus

 The 9K33-1T "Osa-1T" was developed by UE "Tetraedr" from Belarus. A SAM system comprises combat assets and technical support means, including
 the 9А33-1Т TELAR or  "Combat Vehicle" (CV), based on the original BAZ-5937 (or the new MZKT-69222) and equipped with a new day/night camera system OES-1T instead of the original day-only 9Sh33 or 9Sh38-2 "Karat";
 the 9M33M2 or -3 SAMs, or the new 9M33M3-1 with a range of 20 km;
 the 9Т217-1T Transportation and Loading Vehicle (TLV);
 the 9V210-1T Maintenance Vehicle (MV);
 the 9V214-1T Alignment Vehicle (AV);
 the 9V242-1T Automatic Mobile Check-up and Testing Station (AKIPS) and
 the 9F16M2 Ground Equipment Kit (GEK).
 The T38 "Stilet" is a further development of the Osa-1T. Main components are the TELAR T381 on MZKT-69222 chassis and the new missile T382. Maximum range of targets' destruction 20 km, minimal RCS of targets detected 0.02 m2.

Poland
 Osa-AKM-P1 "Żądło" (export name SA-8P Sting) is a Polish upgrade of the 9K33M2 "Osa-AK" and 9K33M3 "Osa-AKM". Probably 32 of the 64 systems purchased from the Soviet Union will be upgraded to keep them in service until 2017. An upgraded TELAR 9A33BM3-P1 was displayed at the MSPO 2004 exhibition in Kielce, Poland. The upgraded vehicle is fitted with a passive detection and identification system SIC 12/TA as well as the ISZ-01 IFF system. 
In 2019 Poland started modification of the whole environment of the Osa system. Those works has been commissioned to WZU Grudziądz. The total cost is about €40-50 million.

Operators

Current operators
  – 28/48 48+
  – 15 units.
 
  – Upgraded to Osa-1T
 
 
 
 
  – 39 systems, 120 cvs in 6 batteries
  - Upgraded OSA-AK in Service 

 
 
  – 20
 
  – 16 launchers and 8 reloaders (one regiment in service since 1989)
  – 400 Since 2007 the Osa-AKM system has modernized and fitted with protection against spoofing
 
  – 14 batteries, composed of 60 independent and autonomous fighting vehicles
  – 40
  – The 9K33M2 Osa-AK is in service.

Former operators

  – 24 missile launch units. Phased out.
  – One regiment which passed to the Czech Republic.
  – Phased out in 2006.
  – 41 Osa-AK. Partially sold to Greece after the German reunification.
  – 50 systems delivered from the Soviet Union between 1982 and 1985. As well as captured Kuwaiti units.
  – retired in 2017, 52 offered for sale. 35 Osa-AKs sold to Armenia before 2020.
  – Purchased in the late 1980s. Captured by the Iraqi forces in the Gulf War.
  – 64. Probably 32 systems upgraded to Osa-AKM-P1 to keep them in service until 2017.
  –  Passed on to successor states.

References
 Federation of American Scientists page 
 Astronautix.com 
 ROSOBORONEXPORT

External links
 AIR-DEFENCE MISSILE LAUNCHER 9K33 "OSA"( 9A33 -CARRIER, 9M33 – MISSILES)(SA-8 GECKO) – Walk around photos
 9K33M2 OSA-AK (SA-8B Gecko) Simulator

Notes

Cold War surface-to-air missiles of the Soviet Union
Self-propelled anti-aircraft weapons of the Soviet Union
Self-propelled anti-aircraft weapons of Russia
Self-propelled anti-aircraft weapons
9K33
9K33
Military vehicles introduced in the 1970s